Charles Anderson may refer to:

Military
 Charles Anderson (VC) (1827–1899), English born Irish recipient of the Victoria Cross
 Charles Alexander Anderson (1857–1940), British Army general
 Charles D. Anderson (1827–1901), American planter, businessman, legislator, and soldier
 Charles DeWitt Anderson (1827–1901), American soldier, railway builder, civil engineer, and lighthouse keeper
 Charles Marley Anderson (1845–1908), U.S. Civil War veteran and politician
 Charles W. Anderson (1844–1916), American soldier and Medal of Honor recipient

Fiction
The Rock (film)#Cast

Politics
 Charles Anderson (governor) (1814–1895), 27th Governor of Ohio
 Charles Anderson (mayor) (1875–1949), mayor of Murray, Utah, 1920–1923
 Charles Anderson (Canadian politician) (1858–1939), Ontario physician and political figure
 Charles Anderson (Texas politician) (born 1945), Texas state representative and veterinarian
 Charles Arthur Anderson (1899–1977), U.S. Representative from Missouri
 Charles Earland Anderson (born 1942), former Alberta provincial politician, 1979–1982
 Charles Groves Wright Anderson (1897–1988), South-African born Australian farmer, politician, and recipient of the Victoria Cross
 Charles Gustav Anderson (1929–2022), Alaska state representative and police officer
 Charles Henry Anderson, British Member of Parliament for Elginshire and Nairnshire, 1886–1889
 Charles Wilson Anderson (1918–2009), Australian politician
 Charles W. Anderson Jr. (1907–1960), American lawyer, state legislator and civil rights leader

Science
 Charles Anderson (mineralogist) (1876–1944), Australian mineralogist and palaeontologist
 Charles Alfred Anderson (1902–1990), American geologist
 Charles E. Anderson (1919–1994), first African American to receive a Ph.D. in meteorology

Sports
 Charles Anderson (cricketer) (1881–1943), Irish cricketer
 Charles Anderson (equestrian) (1914–1993), American 1948 Olympic gold medal winner

Other
 Charles Anderson (vocalist) (1883–after 1937), American vaudeville entertainer and blues singer
 Charles Anderson (businessman) (1917–2009), president and CEO of SRI International, 1968–1980
 Charles Anderson (Emmerdale), fictional character from the ITV soap opera
 Charles Buell Anderson (1927–2008), founder of Endeavor Academy in Wisconsin
 Charles Morris Anderson (born 1957), principal of Charles Anderson Landscape Architecture, Seattle
 Charles P. Anderson (1865–1930), Presiding Bishop of the American Episcopal Church, Bishop of Chicago
 Charles William Anderson (1866–1938), Collector of Revenue in New York City

See also
 Charles A. Anderson (disambiguation)
 Charles Anderton (disambiguation)
 Chuck Anderson (disambiguation)
 Charlie Anderson (born 1981), American football player
 Charlie Anderson (Australian footballer) (1903–1985), Australian rules footballer
 Chic Anderson (1931–1979), American sportscaster and public address announcer born Charles David Anderson